George Carpenter may refer to:
 George Albert Carpenter (1867–1944), U.S. federal judge, Northern District of Illinois
 George Herbert Carpenter (1865–1939), British naturalist and entomologist
 George Moulton Carpenter Jr. (1844–1896), U.S federal judge, District of Rhode Island
 George Rice Carpenter (1863–1909), educator, scholar and author
 George Washington Carpenter (1802–1860), American scientist
 George Carpenter, 1st Baron Carpenter (1657–1731), British soldier, MP and ambassador
 George Carpenter, 2nd Baron Carpenter (1702–1749), British politician
 George Carpenter, 1st Earl of Tyrconnell (1723–1762), 3rd Baron Carpenter, British politician
 George Carpenter, 2nd Earl of Tyrconnell (1750–1805), British nobleman and Member of Parliament
 George Carpenter, 3rd Earl of Tyrconnell (1788–1812), British peer and soldier
 George Carpenter (fencer) (1908–2005), Irish Olympic fencer
 George Carpenter (footballer) (1881–1919), Australian rules footballer
 George Carpenter (Salvation Army) (1872–1948), 5th General of The Salvation Army
 George Carpenter (pilot) (1917–2005), American pilot
 George Carpenter (cricketer) (1818–1849), English cricketer
 George Alfred Carpenter (1859–1910), English physician